"Alright Now" is a song by trance group Above & Beyond and singer-songwriter Justine Suissa. It debuted on the Dance/Mix Show Airplay chart on Billboard.

Track listing

Charts

References 

2017 songs
2017 singles
Electronic songs
Trance songs